Shae Brown (née Bolton; born 28 June 1989 in Melbourne, Australia) is a former Australian netball player. 

Brown's domestic career began with the Melbourne Kestrels in the Commonwealth Bank Trophy in 2006. She moved to the West Coast Fever in 2008, a team she played for in the ANZ Championship for close to a decade. From 2017 onwards she played for the Collingwood Magpies in the Suncorp Super Netball league. Brown announced her retirement from professional netball at the end of the 2018 season.

Both her uncle, Mark Bolton, and her husband, Mitch Brown, have played professional Australian rules football. She played for the Australian Fast5 team in the 2012 Fast5 Netball World Series where she spent time playing Goal Attack.

References

External links
 Shae Brown profile

1989 births
Living people
Australian netball players
West Coast Fever players
Collingwood Magpies Netball players
ANZ Championship players
Melbourne Kestrels players
Suncorp Super Netball players
Netball players from Melbourne
Australian Institute of Sport netball players
Australian Netball League players
Australia international Fast5 players